Form 990 (officially, the "Return of Organization Exempt From Income Tax") is a United States Internal Revenue Service form that provides the public with financial information about a nonprofit organization. It is often the only source of such information.  It is also used by government agencies to prevent organizations from abusing their tax-exempt status. Certain nonprofits have more comprehensive reporting requirements, such as hospitals and other health care organizations (Schedule H).

Variants

Form 990-EZ
There is a variant of Form 990 called Form 990-EZ ("Short Form Return of Organization Exempt From Income Tax"). This form can be used instead of Form 990 for organizations with gross receipts less than $200,000 and total assets less than $500,000 (there are some exceptions).

Form 990-N
Small organizations whose annual gross receipts are "normally $50,000 or less" must file the electronic Form 990-N (officially, "Electronic Notice (e-Postcard) for Tax-Exempt Organizations Not Required to File Form 990 or Form 990EZ"). There is no paper form for 990-N, but it is possible to file instead Form 990 or Form 990-EZ.

Form 990-PF
Form 990-PF is filed by private foundations in the US. It includes fiscal information and a complete list of grants, among other information. The form is due to the IRS 4.5 months after the end of the foundation's fiscal year.

Schedules
In addition to Form 990, tax-exempt organizations are also subject to a variety of disclosure and compliance requirements through various schedules which are attached to Form 990 (and, in some cases, 990-EZ or 990-PF). Filing of schedules by organizations supplements, enhances, and further clarifies disclosures and compliance reporting made in Form 990. Often, filing of schedules is mandatory, but there are situations where organizations not otherwise subject to filing requirements may consider completing certain schedules despite not being technically obligated to.

Filing requirements
Form 990 is due on the 15th of the 5th month after the fiscal year, with the option of a single 6-month extension.

The Form 990 disclosures do not require but strongly encourage nonprofit boards to adopt a variety of board policies regarding governance practices. These suggestions go beyond Sarbanes-Oxley requirements for nonprofits to adopt whistleblower and document retention policies. The IRS has indicated they will use the Form 990 as an enforcement tool, particularly regarding executive compensation. For example, nonprofits that adopt specific procedures regarding executive compensation are offered safe harbor from excessive compensation rules under section 4958 of the Internal Revenue Code and Treasury Regulation section 53.4958-6.

Fiduciary reporting
According to section 1223(b) of the Pension Protection Act of 2006, a nonprofit organization that does not file annual returns or notices for three consecutive years will have its tax-exempt status revoked as of the due date of the third return or notice. An organization's tax-exempt status may be reinstated if it can show reasonable cause for the years of nonfiling.

Who must file?
Form 990 is required to be filed by most tax-exempt organizations under section 501(a). This includes organizations described by any of the subsections of Internal Revenue Code Section 501(c), 501(d) apostolic organizations, 501(e) cooperative hospital service organization, 501(f) cooperative service organizations of schools, 501(j) amateur sports organizations, 501(k) child care organizations, 501(n) charitable risk pools, and 4947(a)(1) nonexempt charitable trusts. Organizations described by any of these sections must file Form 990 even if the organization has not applied for a determination letter from the Internal Revenue Service. 

A tax-exempt organization with annual gross receipts of less than $200,000 and assets less than $500,000 has the option of filing a shorter alternative form, Form 990-EZ instead.

For a tax-exempt organization that normally has gross receipts no more than $50,000 per year, the organization has the option to file a shorter alternative form, Form 990-N instead.

Churches, including houses of worship such as synagogues and mosques, and their integrated auxiliaries, associations of churches, and any religious order that engages exclusively in religious activity are not required to file. A school below college level affiliated with a church or operated by a religious order may be exempt from the requirement to file Form 990.

Filing modalities
The Form 990 may be filed with the IRS by mail or electronically with an authorized IRS e-file provider, for all fiscal years that began before July 1, 2019. In accordance with the Taxpayer First Act of 2019, the Form 990 must be filed electronically, not by mail, for all fiscal years beginning on or after July 1, 2019.

Transition of Form 990-EZ: For tax years ending July 31, 2021, and later, Forms 990-EZ must be filed electronically.

Penalties
There is a penalty of $20 per day that the organization fails to make its Forms 990 publicly available, which is capped at a maximum of $10,000 for any single failure. Any person who willfully fails to comply will be subject to an additional penalty of $5,000. There are other penalties for e.g. omitting information.

In 1998, over $10 million was collected by the IRS for penalties on over 9000 forms.

Public inspection regulations
Public Inspection IRC 6104(d) regulations state that an organization must provide copies of its three most recent Forms 990 to anyone who requests them, whether in person, by mail, fax, or e-mail.

Form 990 data published by IRS 
The IRS publishes Form 990 data in two main forms, as part of the Statistics of Income program:

 An annual extract of tax-exempt organizational data, which covers selected financial data from filters of Form 990, 990-EZ, and 990-PF, with data available from calendar year 2012 to the most recent year for which filing and statistics compilation is complete. This is also available as a public dataset on Google BigQuery.
 As a public dataset on Amazon S3, hosted in the US East region. The dataset includes index files for each year that list nonprofits that filed Form 990 in that year (possibly for a previous year) along with the identifier for their filing. This identifier can be used to fetch their filed Form 990 as a XML file. Data covers returns filed from 2011 to the present and is regularly updated. This dataset is used by Charity Navigator.

Third-party sources of Form 990 
 Google BigQuery, which has IRS Form 990 data as a public dataset. This is based on statistics published by the IRS from 2012 to the most recent completed year.
 Charity Navigator, which maintains a "990 Decoder" website with over 2.5 million tax returns. This is based on forms filed from 2011 to the present, and uploaded by the IRS to Amazon S3.
 Citizen Audit provides PDF copies of annual returns, signatures not blacked out.
 Economic Research Institute provides PDF copies of annual returns, signatures not blacked out.
 Foundation Center IRS Form 990 lookup tool; provides PDF copies of annual returns, signatures blacked out.
 Guidestar IRS Form 990's and other information for selection of nonprofits, free and fee based
 NCCS IRS Form 990 search tool and nonprofit organization profiles, signatures blacked out.
 BoardSource Governance requirements in 990.
 Open990 distributes timeseries data reports on compensation and financial indicators using fuzzy matching against the AWS dataset
 ProPublica's Nonprofit Explorer allows search by an organization's name, a keyword, or city as well as by reported officers or employees. Summary data and full PDFs are freely available for download; no registration required.

History
Form 990 was first used for the tax year ending in 1941. It was as a two-page form. Organizations were also required to include a schedule with the names and addresses of individuals paid a salary of at least $4,000 during the year and a schedule with the names and addresses of donors who had given at least $4,000 during the year.

Form 990 reached four pages including instructions in 1947. Compensation of officers was reported separately on organizations' income statements but organizations were no longer required to include a schedule with the names and addresses of highly compensated individuals. Organizations were required to include a schedule with the names and addresses of donors who had given at least $3,000 during the year.

In 1969, Congress passed a law requiring the reporting of the compensation paid to officers by 501(c)(3) organizations. The IRS extended this requirement to all other tax-exempt organizations. 

In 1976, Form 990 was 6 pages including instructions, with 8 pages for Schedule A. By 2000, Form 990 was six pages, Schedule A was six pages, Schedule B was at least 2 pages, and instructions were 42 pages. The increase in pages was due to use of a larger font size and the inclusion of sections that are only required for certain organizations.

Starting in 2000, political organizations were required to file Form 990.

In June 2007, the IRS released a revised Form 990 that requires significant disclosures on corporate governance and boards of directors. These new disclosures are required for all filers for the 2009 tax year, with more significant reporting requirements for organizations with either revenues exceeding $1 million or assets exceeding $2.5 million.

In 2010, the minimum threshold of when an organization is required to file Form 990 was increased; the minimum annual gross receipts was increased from $100,000 to $200,000 and the minimum assets was increased from $250,000 to $500,000.

With the availability of the internet, access to the Form 990 of an organization has also become easier. Originally Form 990 had to be requested through the IRS. This was changed to allow access to the form directly through the organization, although in some cases organizations refused to provide access.

On July 16, 2018, the IRS announced that only 501(c)(3) organizations, 4947(a)(1) nonexempt charitable trusts, and 6033(d) nonexempt private foundations are required to report the names and addresses of donors on Schedule B. All other tax-exempt organizations will be allowed to omit the names and addresses of donors when completing Schedule B, although they are still required to retain that information and report that information upon request by the IRS. The change in reporting requirements is effective with all tax years ending on or after December 31, 2018. The change did not affect reporting of donors by 527 political organizations. The IRS said that the change in reporting was made in the discretion of the Commissioner of Internal Revenue who had determined that the IRS generally does not use the donors' information, and exclusion of this information from Schedule B would reduce the risk of accidentally releasing confidential information to the public while reducing the organizations' time and cost of preparing Form 990. Some states continue to require disclosure of this information to state agencies. The state of Montana and the state of New Jersey filed a lawsuit stating that the IRS had violated the Administrative Procedure Act by waiving the donor disclosure requirements without allowing the public to comment on the new procedure. A federal judge agreed and reinstated the donor disclosure requirements. On September 6, the IRS issued proposed regulations that would again suspend the requirement for affected organizations to disclose their donors on Schedule B and allow the public to comment on the new procedure in compliance with the Administrative Procedure Act. The IRS may finalize the proposed regulations on or after December 9, 2019.

Use for charity evaluation research
Charity Navigator uses IRS Forms 990 to rate charities. In February 2017, Charity Navigator launched the Digitized Form 990 Decoder, a free and open-source software dataset and tools to analyze Form 990 filings. At launch, more than 900,000 forms had been processed.

Meanwhile Holden Karnofsky of the nonprofit charity evaluator GiveWell has criticized Form 990 for not providing sufficient information about what a charity does or where it operates. However GiveWell does still use Form 990 to answer some questions when investigating charities.

Data from Form 990 was used by Sarah Reckhow as an information source for her book Follow the Money: How Foundation Dollars Change Public School Politics. Reckhow expressed concern about the lack of corresponding public data available if philanthropic funders moved away from nonprofits to LLCs such as the Chan Zuckerberg Initiative.
 
There was a website called Quality 990 that advocated for higher quality Form 990s.

See also
 United States non-profit laws
 Philanthropy in the United States
 Form 1040
 Form 1120
 Form 1023

References

0990
Non-profit organizations based in the United States